Conmee is a township in the Canadian province of Ontario, located within the Thunder Bay District.

The township was named after James Conmee (October 13, 1848 – July 23, 1913 - an Ontario businessman and political figure) and is part of the city of Thunder Bay's Census Metropolitan Area. Its main named settlements were the communities of Mokomon and Hume, now historical footnotes in Conmee's development.

Conmee Township was home to a Summer Solstice festival during the late 1960s and throughout the 1970s.  Although the summer solstice in the Northern Hemisphere officially occurs around the 21st of June, Conmee's festival would take place over the "Victoria Day" long weekend, at a location colloquially known as "Mokomon's Farm", where people would set up tents in the fields and meadows, local folk and rock music bands would provide entertainment, and local crafts persons would display their art.

In 2013, Conmee commemorated its 100th Anniversary since incorporation through several community activities.

In 2017, Canada Census 2016 showed a 7.2% population growth since 2011.

Demographics 

See also
List of townships in Ontario

References

External links 

Municipalities in Thunder Bay District
Single-tier municipalities in Ontario
Township municipalities in Ontario